Mathilda  is a genus of sea snails, marine gastropod mollusks in the family Mathildidae.

Species

 Mathilda amaea Dall, 1927
 Mathilda amanda Thiele, 1925
 Mathilda argentina Castellanos, 1990
 Mathilda barbadensis Dall, 1889
 Mathilda bieleri Smriglio & Mariottini, 2007
 Mathilda boucheti Bieler, 1995
 Mathilda brevicula Bavay, 1922
 Mathilda brownae Smriglio, Mariottini & Swinnen, 2017
 Mathilda cancellata Kuroda, 1958
 Mathilda carystia Melvill & Standen, 1903
 Mathilda cerea Kuroda, 1958
 Mathilda cochlaeformis Brugnone, 1873
 Mathilda coronata Monterosato, 1875
 Mathilda cryptostoma de Folin, 1874
 Mathilda decorata Hedley, 1903
 Mathilda epicharis de Folin, 1870
 Mathilda fusca (Okutani & Habe, 1981)
 Mathilda gemmulata Semper, 1865
 Mathilda gemmulifera Kuroda, 1958
 Mathilda georgiana Dall, 1927
 Mathilda globulifera Dall, 1927
 Mathilda granifera Dall, 1927
 Mathilda hendersoni Dall, 1927
 Mathilda herberti Mariottini, Smriglio & di Giulio, 2009
 Mathilda houbricki Bieler, 1995
 Mathilda lacteosa Dall, 1927
 Mathilda letei Prki & Smriglio, 2007
 Mathilda maculosa Bieler, 1995
 Mathilda magellanica P. Fischer, 1873
 Mathilda malvinarum (Melvill & Standen, 1907)
 Mathilda maoria (Powell, 1940)
 Mathilda mozambicensis Mariottini, Smriglio & di Giulio, 2009
 Mathilda quadricarinata (Brocchi, 1814)
 Mathilda quinquelirata Kuroda, 1958
 Mathilda retusa Brugnone, 1873
 Mathilda rhigomaches Melvill & Standen, 1912
 Mathilda richeri Bieler, 1995
 Mathilda rushii Dall, 1889
 Mathilda sagamiensis (Kuroda & Habe in Kuroda, Habe & Oyama, 1971)
 Mathilda salve Barnard, 1963
 Mathilda sansibarica Thiele, 1925
 Mathilda scalaris (Kuroda & Habe in Kuroda, Habe & Oyama, 1971)
 Mathilda scitula Dall, 1889
 Mathilda sinensis P. Fischer, 1867
 Mathilda trochlea Mörch, 1875
 Mathilda vanaartseni De Jong & Coomans, 1988
 Mathilda yucatecana (Dall, 1881)
 Mathilda zmitampis Melvill & Standen, 1901

Species brought into synonymy
 Mathilda canariensis Dautzenberg, 1890: synonym of Mathilda gemmulata Semper, 1865 (synonym)
 Mathilda elegans de Folin, 1870: synonym of Liamorpha elegans (de Folin, 1870) (original combination)
 Mathilda eurytima Melvill & Standen, 1896: synonym of Cerithium nodulosum Bruguière, 1792
 Mathilda granolirata Brugnone, 1873: synonym of Mathilda cochlaeformis Brugnone, 1873 (synonym)
 Mathilda haasi Mienis, 1978: synonym of Mathilda gemmulata Semper, 1865 (synonym)
 Mathilda jeffreysi Dall, 1889: synonym of Tuba jeffreysi (Dall, 1889)
 Mathilda neozelanica Suter, 1908: synonym of Brookesena neozelanica (Suter, 1908)
 Mathilda rosae Hedley, 1901: synonym of Charilda rosae (Hedley, 1901)
 Mathilda telamonia Melvill, 1912: synonym of Mathilda sinensis P. Fischer, 1867

References

 Bieler R. (1995) Mathildidae from New Caledonia and the Loyalty Islands (Gastropoda: Heterobranchia). In P. Bouchet (ed.), Résultats des Campagnes MUSORSTOM, volume 14. Mémoires du Muséum National d'Histoire Naturelle 167:595-641

External links

Mathildidae